I and You is a 1953 West German comedy film directed by Alfred Weidenmann and starring Hardy Krüger, Liselotte Pulver and Claus Biederstaedt. It was shot at the Bavaria Studios in Munich and on location in Italy. The film's sets were designed by the art directors Franz Bi and Bruno Monden.

Cast
 Hardy Krüger as Peter Erdmann
 Liselotte Pulver as Brigitte
 Claus Biederstaedt as Paul
 Doris Kirchner as Marianne
 Peer Schmidt as Charly
 Arno Paulsen as Vater Erdmann
 Edith Schultze-Westrum as Mutter Erdmann
 Lucie Mannheim as Tante Gruber
 Otto Brüggemann as Der Nervöse
 Hans Hermann Schaufuß as Der Forsche
 Ursula Herking as Die Nachbarin
 Kurt Waitzmann as Herr Roland

References

Bibliography 
 Parish, James Robert. Film Actors Guide. Scarecrow Press, 1977.

External links 
 

1953 films
1953 comedy films
German comedy films
West German films
1950s German-language films
Films directed by Alfred Weidenmann
German black-and-white films
1950s German films
Films shot in Italy
Films shot at Bavaria Studios